A leadership election was held by the United Malays National Organisation (UMNO) party on 18 March 2023.

Background

In the aftermath of the 2022 Malaysian general election, Khairy Jamaluddin, Noh Omar, Shahril Sufian Hamdan and several UMNO leaders called for party leader Ahmad Zahid Hamidi to resign.

Controversies
On 14 January 2023, the UMNO general assembly has given consent to a motion for the posts of president and deputy president not to be contested at the coming party polls. Therefore, President of UMNO, Ahmad Zahid Hamidi and Deputy President of UMNO, Mohamad Hasan will remain at their position respectively for another term until 2026. 

On 28 January 2023, Khairy Jamaluddin and Noh Omar was sacked from the party while Hishammuddin Hussein, Shahril Sufian Hamdan, Maulizan Bujang and Salim Shariff was suspended their membership for six years by the UMNO supreme council.

Supreme Council election results

Permanent Chairman

Deputy Permanent Chairman

President

Deputy President

Vice Presidents

Supreme Council Members

See also
 President of the United Malays National Organisation
 2020–2022 Malaysian political crisis
 2022 Malaysian general election
 Anwar Ibrahim cabinet
 2018 United Malays National Organisation leadership election
 United Malays National Organisation leadership elections

References

External links
 List of UMNO Election Candidates 2023-2026
 Full Results of the 2023-2026 UMNO Wing Committee Election
 Full Results of UMNO Supreme Working Council Members 2023-2026 Election

2023 elections in Malaysia
United Malays National Organisation leadership election
United Malays National Organisation leadership elections